Pseudomphalus is a monotypic genus of large, air-breathing land snails, pulmonate gastropods in the subfamily Rhytidinae of the family Rhytididae.

Species
 Pseudomphalus megei (Lambert, 1873): endemic to New Caledonia.

References

External links
  Hausdorf B. (2013). Revision of the endemic genera Diplomphalus and Pseudomphalus from New Caledonia (Gastropoda, Rhytididae). Zoosystema. 35(1): 69-88.

Rhytididae